The Gansong Art Museum, located in Seongbuk-dong, Seongbuk District, Seoul, South Korea, is the first modern private museum of Korea and was founded by Jeon Hyeongpil (전형필 全鎣弼) in 1938. The museum was named after the pen name of the founder, Gansong (간송 澗松). The aim of the foundation was to prevent Japanese removal of Korean cultural properties, during the Japanese occupation. At times, numerous Korean cultural properties were taken to Japan, such as Goryeo porcelains, statues of Buddha made in Silla kingdom, documents and books made in Joseon dynasty. Jeon Hyeongpil contributed at his own expense to protect Korean culture and art.

The museum holds many top-rated antique pieces of art such as Hunmin jeongeum (No. 70 National Treasure), Donggukjeongun Book 1, 2 (No. 71 National Treasure), Geumdong gyemimyeong samjonbul (No. 72 National Treasure), Hyewon pungsokdo.

Gallery

See also
Korean painting
List of museums in South Korea
National Treasures of South Korea

References

External links
  Brief information about Gansong Art Museum
  Brief information about Gansong Art Museum from Yahoo Korea dictionary

 
1938 establishments in Korea
Art museums established in 1938